Berrington is a village in Worcestershire, England.

Berrington was in the upper division of Doddingtree hundred.

References

Villages in Worcestershire
Tenbury Wells